Ilya Vyacheslavovich Dyomin (born 22 July 1996) is a Russian football player.

Club career
He made his debut in the Russian Professional Football League for FC Tekstilshchik Ivanovo on 18 August 2016 in a game against FC Spartak Kostroma. He made his Russian Football National League debut for Tekstilshchik on 5 October 2019 in a game against FC Armavir.

References

External links
 Profile by Russian Professional Football League

1996 births
Sportspeople from Ivanovo
Living people
Russian footballers
Association football midfielders
FC Tekstilshchik Ivanovo players